Cristofer Jordan Rosales González (born 6 October 1994) is a Nicaraguan professional boxer who held the WBC flyweight title in 2018.

Professional career

Rosales turned professional in 2013 and had a record 26–3 before challenging Japanese boxer Daigo Higa for the vacant WBC flyweight title. During the weigh-in for the fight Higa missed weight and the title became vacant with only Rosales eligible to win it. In the fight itself Rosales would go on to stop Higa in the ninth round to capture the vacant WBC title.

In his first title defence, Rosales defeated two-time Olympic bronze medalist Paddy Barnes. Barnes started the fight well, but Rosales caught him with a body shot in the fourth, from which Barnes could not get up.

In his second title defence, Rosales suffered a surprising loss to Charlie Edwards. Rosales started the fight well, but Edwards was staying calm and boxing smart throughout the fight, earning him the unanimous decision (UD) victory over the Nicaraguan.

On 20 December 2019, Rosales fought Julio Cesar Martinez for the WBC flyweight title, after a decision from Edwards to not take the rematch against Martinez and vacate his title. Both fighter came out aggressively and traded punches in the opening rounds. From the third round on, Martinez was starting to dominate the fight and hurt Rosales, until the referee decided to stop the fight in round nine.

Professional boxing record

See also
List of world flyweight boxing champions

References

External links

Cristofer Rosales - Profile, News Archive & Current Rankings at Box.Live

|-

|-

|-

|-

|-

1994 births
Living people
Sportspeople from Managua
Nicaraguan male boxers
Light-flyweight boxers
World flyweight boxing champions
World Boxing Council champions